Rassvet is a rural locality (a village) in Bikkulovsky Selsoviet, Miyakinsky District, Bashkortostan, Russia. The population was 304 as of 2010. There are 8 streets.

Geography 
Rassvet is located 22 km north of Kirgiz-Miyaki (the district's administrative centre) by road. Bikkulovo is the nearest rural locality.

References 

Rural localities in Miyakinsky District